Forgan is a surname of Scottish origin. The surname was first found in Fife, where they held a family seat in their territories.

Notable people with the surname include:

 Liz Forgan (born 1944), English journalist and radio & TV executive
 Robert Forgan (1891–1976), British politician
 Tommy Forgan (1929–2019), English former football goalkeeper
 William Forgan Smith (1887–1953), premier of Queensland, Australia

References